Gaius Bellicius Calpurnius Torquatus was a Roman senator during the reign of Antoninus Pius. He was consul posterior in 148 as the colleague of Lucius Octavius Cornelius Publius Salvius Julianus Aemilianus. Calpurnius Torquatus was the son of Gaius Bellicius Flaccus Torquatus Tebanianus, consul of 124, and the younger brother of Gaius Bellicius Flaccus Torquatus, consul of 143.

Subsequent to his consulate, Calpurnius Torquatus was patron of the Roman town of Vienne in Gaul.

See also 
 Bellicia gens

References 

2nd-century Romans
Imperial Roman consuls
Calpurnius Torquatus, Gaius